This page provides a partial list of television shows set in the State of New Jersey.

Live format
Brick City
Comic Book Men
Jersey Shore
Jerseylicious
Miss America Pageant (1954–2005), held in Atlantic City starting in 1921, first televised in 1954, moved to Las Vegas in 2006
MTV's Shore Thing (2002),  live programming originated from the Seaside Heights Boardwalk and beach
MTV's Summer Share (1998), live programming originated from the Seaside Heights Boardwalk and beach
The Real Housewives of New Jersey
The Richard Bey Show (1987–1996), also known as People are Talking and 9 Broadcast Plaza; originated from Secaucus

Comedy, drama, and reality
Akkara Kazhchakal, popular Malayalam sitcom series
The Apprentice (2004–present), frequent tasks at Trump Organization properties in New Jersey 
Aqua Teen Hunger Force (series run: 2000–2015; years set in New Jersey: 2000-2010), near the southern Jersey Shore
Batman (animated series), set in Gotham City, a fictional city of New Jersey
Boardwalk Empire (2010–2014), drama set in Atlantic City during the Prohibition Era 
Cake Boss (2009–present), reality show set at Carlo's Bake Shop in Hoboken 
Charles in Charge (1984–1990), near the fictional Copeland College in New Brunswick
Down the Shore (1992–1993), Belmar, New Jersey on the Jersey Shore
Glam Fairy follows Jerseylicious star Alexa Prisco and her team of hair and makeup artists, also known as her "fairies"  at the Glam Factory in Hoboken, New Jersey
House (2004–2012), fictional Princeton-Plainsboro Teaching Hospital (presumably in Plainsboro)
Hudson Street (1995-1996), short-lived sitcom starring Tony Danza and Lori Loughlin, took place at a fictional newspaper in Hoboken 
Jersey Couture (2010–present), features Diane & Co., a dress shop in Freehold, NJ
Jersey Shore follows the lives of eight soon-to-be roommates living and working together for the summer in Seaside Heights, New Jersey
Jerseylicious (2010), reality show set at the Gatsby Salon in Green Brook
Jonas (2009–2010), starring The Jonas Brothers, who originate in New Jersey
Megas XLR (2004–2005), set in Jersey City
Method & Red (2004), unspecified New Jersey suburb (presumably near New York City)
Nikita (2010–2013), set in and around New Jersey and the primary fictional setting of the show is set in underground New Jersey
Point Pleasant (2005), Supernatural drama set in Point Pleasant
Ramy (2019-present), set in New Jersey
The Sopranos (1999–2007), various parts of Essex County and other counties in New Jersey (with occasional scenes in Manhattan)
Stand by Your Man (1992), set in "Franklin Heights"
That's Life (2000–2002), fictitious "Bellefield" (ostensibly Belleville or Bloomfield)
WandaVision (2021), set in the fictitious town of Westview, New Jersey
Cobra Kai (2018), set in New Jersey
Yellowjackets (2021)

Game shows
’’Trump Card’’ (1990–1991), filmed at Trump Castle (Now The Golden Nugget) in Atlantic City

News
CNBC – most of its in-studio programming originates from Fort Lee
MSNBC – most of its in-studio programming originates from Secaucus
New Jersey Network – most of its in-studio programming originates from Trenton or Newark
News 12 New Jersey – central studio-office complex in Edison; with remote newsrooms in Newark, Trenton, Madison, Oakland and Wall Township

See also
 Television and film in New Jersey
 List of movies based on location
 List of people from New Jersey
 Thomas Edison
 Kevin Smith

References

 
New Jersey
Television shows set in New Jersey